The 2002–03 season was the 62nd season in the existence of Albacete Balompié and the club's seventh consecutive season in the second division of Spanish football. In addition to the domestic league, Albacete participated in this season's edition of the Copa del Rey. The season covered the period from 1 July 2002 to 30 June 2003. The club achieved promotion to the top flight after finishing in third place.

Competitions

Overall record

Segunda División

League table

Results summary

Results by round

Matches

Copa del Rey

References 

Albacete Balompié seasons
Albacete